Newton Food Centre (纽顿熟食中心) is a major hawker centre in Newton, Singapore. The food centre was promoted by the Singapore Tourism Board (STB) as a tourist attraction for sampling Singaporean cuisine. It was first opened in 1971 and it closed down in 2005 as the government wanted to revamp the food centre. The food centre then went through a major renovation before reopening on 1 July 2006.

History

During renovation, Newton Food Centre was temporarily moved to an open space nearby along Bukit Timah Road. However, the stall owners suffered some losses as turnover was lower than at the original site. Also, due to the lack of parking facilities, some motorists parked illegally along the side of the roads near the temporary food centre. The police put up barriers to prevent illegal road-side parking and encourage motorists to park at the food centre's parking lot. After the renovations, stall owners at the temporary food centre moved back to the new food centre.

In October 2022, the food centre underwent another round of renovation.

Design

The newly built food centre follows the design elements from the nearby old colonial houses. The colour scheme of the food centre is white, black and brown and the ceilings are seven metres high, ensuring cross-ventilation and a cooler environment. The newly built food centre will also protect some of the patrons sitting in the open space from being wet during the rain as they are shaded by large umbrellas which does not really protect customers from the rain as the rain drips on their seat, unlike the previous food centre where patrons had more seating capacity even when it was raining. Blinds are also available for extra shade from the scorching sun in the afternoons. There are 83 stalls and they are arranged in a horseshoe configuration, featuring the same hawkers who cooked their own-style local favourites like barbecue stingray, fishball noodles, popiah, satay and fried oyster omelette. CCTVs have also been installed. Spaces have also been created so buskers can perform and entertain the patrons. Small flea markets can also be set up.

Flora in the food centre
More than 50 species of flowers, including pink frangipani, wedelia creepers and several species of palms, have been planted around the food centre area, especially at the main entrance and around the seats in the middle section of the hawker centre. These plants had been incorporated into the landscape to re-create a plantation feel.

Controversies
Despite being promoted by the STB for sampling Singaporean cuisine, Newton Food Centre is often criticised by locals for overpricing and mediocre food quality. It is particularly infamous for incessant touting, overcharging and harassment of customers by over-zealous stall owners.

On the other hand, some of their food sellers got distinctions from the Michelin Guide.
 	
On 14 March 2009, six American tourists were charged S$491 for a meal at Tanglin's Best BBQ Seafood. In this case of flagrant overcharging, The National Environment Agency imposed a 3-month ban on the stall and banned his assistant from working there for one year.

References

Further reading

 

Buildings and structures completed in 2006
Hawker centres in Singapore
Newton, Singapore
1971 establishments in Singapore